Rosney is an unincorporated community in Buckingham County, in the U.S. state of Virginia.

Geography 
Rosney is located in eastern Buckingham County at 37°30'34"N 78°25'31"W (37.50944444, -78.42527778). U.S. Route 60 is the community's major thoroughfare.

References

Unincorporated communities in Virginia
Unincorporated communities in Buckingham County, Virginia